Manfred Dollmann (born 31 August 1964) is an Austrian para table tennis player who competes in international level events. He is a double European champion, five-time World medalist and has participated at the Paralympic Games seven times winning two medals.

When Dollmann was 16, he was riding his moped too fast and he slipped on a road bend then landed on his back on a stone on a small stream bed resulting in paraplegia.

References

1964 births
Living people
Paralympic table tennis players of Austria
Table tennis players at the 1988 Summer Paralympics
Table tennis players at the 1992 Summer Paralympics
Table tennis players at the 1996 Summer Paralympics
Table tennis players at the 2000 Summer Paralympics
Table tennis players at the 2004 Summer Paralympics
Table tennis players at the 2008 Summer Paralympics
Table tennis players at the 2012 Summer Paralympics
Medalists at the 1992 Summer Paralympics
Medalists at the 1996 Summer Paralympics
Austrian male table tennis players